Gashua is a community in Yobe State in northeastern Nigeria, on the Yobe River a few miles below the convergence of the Hadejia River and the Jama'are River. Average elevation is about 299 m. The population in 2006 was about 125,000.
The hottest months are March and April with temperature ranges of 38-40o Celsius. In the rainy season, June–September,  temperatures fall to 23-28o Celsius, with rainfall of 500 to 1000mm.

Town

Gashua is one of the largest and most developed towns in Yobe State. Since 1976, it has been headquarters of the Bade Local Government Area. The town lies near the Nguru-Gashua Wetlands, an economically and ecologically important ecological system.
The town is the location of the court of Mai Bade, the Emir of Bade.

Language 
The Bade language is spoken in Gashua and in an area fanning out east and south of Gashua. Bade is one of seven languages of the Chadic family indigenous to Yobe State.

Other Towns 
The town of Kumariya is also located in the Gashua area.

References

Populated places in Yobe State